Lee Purcell (born Lee Jeune Williams; June 15, 1947) is an American actress who worked primarily in the 1970s and 1980s.

Early life
Purcell was born Lee Jeune Williams at the Marine Corps Air Station Cherry Point (North Carolina), the elder daughter of Major Frank D. Williams Jr., a highly decorated Marine Corps pilot who was killed while on active duty when she was two months old. Her mother, Lee ( McKnight) Williams (1925-2014), remarried, to Dr. Donald I. "Don" Purcell, a U.S. Navy doctor assigned to the Marine Corps. Lee Purcell has a younger sister, Paige Wooldridge. 

She graduated from Paragould High School in 1965 and briefly attended Stephens College in Columbia, Missouri as a dance and theatre student until she was expelled.

Career

After being expelled  from Stephens College, Purcell arrived in California in 1967 and studied acting. Casting off her southern accent was another goal she successfully worked on. Purcell supported herself by working in commercials and selling clothes at a disco.

In 1969, Purcell was personally chosen for her first feature film by Steve McQueen in his company's production of Adam at Six A.M., co-starring Michael Douglas. Asked to explain why he picked Purcell among nearly 500 other available actresses, McQueen said, "It wasn't easy. We kept narrowing down the field over a period of weeks until it came to giving screen tests to six of them. All of them were good, but Lee seemed to jump right out of the screen."

Her television work included roles as Billie Dove and Olivia de Havilland in two biopic TV movies: The Amazing Howard Hughes (1977) and My Wicked, Wicked Ways: The Legend of Errol Flynn (1985).

She was nominated for two Emmy Awards. In 1991, she was nominated as Outstanding Lead Actress for Long Road Home. and in 1994 as Outstanding Supporting Actress for Secret Sins of the Father. She was co-producer, and starred in the 1998 low-budget cable-TV movie Malaika (alternate title Tons of Trouble).

Purcell's film career wound down in 1983 and she has only had five motion picture credits since, the last in 2015. She has continued to do television projects. She also continues to stay active by performing narrations of poetry and fiction in front of live audiences.

Personal life

In December 2010 Purcell launched an interactive fashion and beauty website, BoomerBabes, geared towards Baby Boomer women born between 1946 and 1964. The website did not gain any visitors and BoomerBabes stopped updating in 2014.

Filmography

Feature films

Television

Special projects

References

External links

Fashion and beauty website created by Purcell

1947 births
Living people
20th-century American actresses
21st-century American actresses
Actresses from Arkansas
Actresses from North Carolina
American film actresses
American Scientologists
American television actresses
People from Cherry Point, North Carolina
People from Paragould, Arkansas
Stephens College alumni